Chorebus claripennis is a genus of wasps in the family Braconidae. It was described in a 1984 publication by Griffiths.

References 

claripennis
Insects described in 1984